Cyperus mauretaniensis is a species of sedge that is native to north western parts of Africa.

See also 
 List of Cyperus species

References 

mauretaniensis
Plants described in 2005
Flora of Algeria
Flora of Senegal
Flora of Mali
Flora of Mauritania